The 1991 Dow Classic was a women's tennis tournament played on outdoor grass courts that was part of Tier IV of the 1991 WTA Tour. It was the 10th edition of the event. It took place at the Edgbaston Priory Club in Birmingham, United Kingdom from 10 June until 16 June 1991.

Entrants

Seeds

Other entrants
The following players received entry from the qualifying draw:
  Katrina Adams
  Suzanna Wibowo
  Sandy Collins
  Jo-Anne Faull
  Michelle Jaggard
  Maria Lindström
  Cammy MacGregor
  Rennae Stubbs

The following players received a lucky loser spot:
  Miriam Oremans
  Catherine Suire

Finals

Singles

 Martina Navratilova defeated  Natalia Zvereva 6–4, 7–6(8–6)
 It was Navratilova's 3rd singles title of the year and the 155th of her career.

Doubles

 Nicole Provis /  Elizabeth Smylie defeated  Sandy Collins /  Elna Reinach 6–3, 6–4
 It was Provis' second doubles title of the year and the 6th of her career. It was Smylie's third doubles title of the year and the 31st of her career.

External links
 1991 Dow Classic draws
 ITF tournament edition details

Dow Classic
Birmingham Classic (tennis)
Dow Classic
Dow Classic